Nawan Sohawa (نیا سوہاوہ) is a village located in Pasrur, Sialkot District, Pakistan, with a population of 2000.

Villages in Sialkot District